Volodymyr is a Ukrainian given name of Old East Slavic origin. The related Ancient Slavic, such as Czech, Russian, Serbian, Croatian, etc. form of the name is Володимѣръ Volodiměr, which in other Slavic languages became Vladimir (from ).

Diminutives include Volodyk, Volodia, Lodgo and Vlodko

People known as Volodymyr
 Volodymyr the Great (aka St. Volodymyr, Volodymyr I of Kyiv), Grand Prince of Kyiv
 Volodymyr II Monomakh, Grand Prince of Kyiv
 Volodymyr Atamanyuk (born 1955), Soviet footballer
 Volodymyr Bahaziy (1902–1942), Ukrainian nationalist 
 Volodymyr Barilko (born 1994), Ukrainian football striker
 Volodymyr Bezsonov (born 1958), Ukrainian football manager and player
 Volodymyr Chesnakov (born 1988), Ukrainian footballer
 Volodymyr Demchenko (born 1981), Ukrainian sprinter who competed in the 2004 Summer Olympics
 Volodymyr Dyudya (born 1983), Ukrainian racing cyclist
 Volodymyr Gerun (born 1994), Ukrainian basketball player
 Volodymyr Groysman (born 1978), Prime Minister of Ukraine (2016–19)
 Volodymyr Herashchenko (born 1968), Ukrainian footballer
 Volodymyr Holubnychy (born 1936), Ukrainian race walker
 Volodymyr Homenyuk (born 1985), Ukrainian footballer
 Volodymyr Horilyi (born 1965), Soviet-Ukrainian football defender
 Volodymyr Huba (1938–2020), Ukrainian composer
 Volodymyr Inozemtsev (born 1964), Ukrainian triple jumper
 Volodymyr Ivasyuk (1949–1979), Ukrainian songwriter, composer and poet
 Volodymyr Kaliuzhniy (born 1972), Ukrainian fencer
 Volodymyr Kaplychnyi (1944–2004), Soviet footballer of Jewish descent
 Volodymyr Kilikevych (born 1983), Ukrainian footballer
 Volodymyr Lozynskyi (1955–2020), Soviet-Ukrainian football coach and player
 Volodymyr Lukashenko (born 1980), Ukrainian sabre fencer
 Volodymyr Lyutyi (born 1962) Ukrainian football coach and player
 Volodymyr Mykhailenko (born 1973), Ukrainian decathlete
 Volodymyr Nikolaychuk (born 1975), Ukrainian backstroke swimmer
 Volodymyr Onyshchenko (born 1949), Soviet footballer
 Volodymyr Parasyuk (born 1987), Ukrainian public figure
 Volodymyr Pianykh (born 1951), Soviet footballer
 Volodymyr Ploskina (1954–2010), Ukrainian professional footballer
 Volodymyr Polyovyi (born 1985), Ukrainian football defender
 Volodymyr Pryyomov (born 1986), Ukrainian football player
 Volodymyr Raskatov (1957–2014), Ukrainian swimmer
Volodymyr Romaniuk (1925–1995), the Patriarch of the Ukrainian Orthodox Church – Kyiv Patriarchate
 Volodymyr Rybin (born 1980), Ukrainian racing cyclist
 Volodymyr Sabodan (1935–2014), head of the Ukrainian Orthodox Church
 Volodymyr Shatskykh (born 1981), Ukrainian former Olympic Greco-Roman wrestler
 Volodymyr Shcherbytsky (1918–1990), Ukrainian Communist and Soviet politician
 Volodymyr Starchyk (born 1980), Ukrainian racing cyclist
 Volodymyr Tkachenko (swimmer) (born 1965), Ukrainian swimmer who competed in the 1988 Summer Olympics
 Volodymyr Troshkin (born 1947), Soviet-Ukrainian football player and coach
 Volodymyr Yezerskiy (born 1976), Ukrainian football defender
 Volodymyr Zagorodniy (born 1983), Ukrainian road bicycle racer
 Volodymyr Zelenskyy (born 1978), current President of Ukraine, former actor and comedian
 Volodymyr Zyuskov (born 1981), Ukrainian long jumper

See also
 Volodymyr (city), a Ukrainian town
 Wolodarsky (surname)

Ukrainian masculine given names
Slavic masculine given names